Forkland is a town in Greene County, Alabama, United States. At the 2020 census, the population was 445. It was incorporated around 1974.

History
Forkland has one site on the National Register of Historic Places, St. John's-In-The-Prairie, built in 1859, and two sites nearby, Rosemount and Thornhill.

Geography
Forkland is located in southern Greene County at  (32.647702, -87.867236), between the Black Warrior River  to the east and the Tombigbee River  to the west. The Black Warrior joins the Tombigbee  to the south of Forkland, just north of Demopolis. U.S. Route 43 passes through Forkland, leading north  to Eutaw, the county seat, and south  to Demopolis.

Demographics

2020 census

Note: the US Census treats Hispanic/Latino as an ethnic category. This table excludes Latinos from the racial categories and assigns them to a separate category. Hispanics/Latinos can be of any race.

2000 Census
As of the census of 2000, there were 629 people, 245 households, and 161 families residing in the town. The racial makeup of the town was 10.65% White, 89.19% Black or African American, and 0.16% from two or more races.

There were 245 households, out of which 36.3% had children under the age of 18 living with them, 35.5% were married couples living together, 27.8% had a female householder with no husband present, and 33.9% were non-families. 32.7% of all households were made up of individuals, and 10.6% had someone living alone who was 65 years of age or older. The average household size was 2.57 and the average family size was 3.32.

In the town, the population was spread out, with 31.8% under the age of 18, 6.8% from 18 to 24, 26.1% from 25 to 44, 24.5% from 45 to 64, and 10.8% who were 65 years of age or older. The median age was 34 years. For every 100 females, there were 88.3 males. For every 100 females age 18 and over, there were 77.3 males.

The median income for a household in the town was $18,698, and the median income for a family was $22,115. Males had a median income of $24,375 versus $16,544 for females. The per capita income for the town was $9,314. About 29.5% of families and 31.5% of the population were below the poverty line, including 38.2% of those under age 18 and 31.0% of those age 65 or over.

Notable people
Maxie Baughan, former NFL player
Charlotte Durante, first African American female city commissioner in Delray Beach, Florida
Bobo Jenkins, born in Forkland, electric blues guitarist and songwriter, who later owned his own recording studio and record label in Detroit
Lloyd Leftwich, state senator during the Reconstruction era

Gallery
Photographs of Forkland structures were taken for the Historic American Buildings Survey in 1933:

References

External links
 Forkland.com

Towns in Greene County, Alabama
Towns in Alabama
Tuscaloosa, Alabama metropolitan area